The 1998 Mongolian National Championship was the thirty-first recorded edition of top flight football in Mongolia and the third season of the Mongolian Premier League, which took over as the highest level of competition in the country from the previous Mongolian National Championship. Erchim were champions, their second title, Delger, (Wide) from Delger in the sum (district) of Govi-Altai Province in western Mongolia were  runners up, with Dinozavr in third place.

References

Mongolia Premier League seasons
Mongolia
Mongolia
football